Gorgun Taner (born 1959) is the general director of the Istanbul Foundation for Culture and Arts (İKSV), a non-profit, non-governmental organisation founded in 1973 that organises four international festivals (film, theatre, classical music and jazz), the Istanbul Biennial, and the Istanbul Design Biennial. He has been working at the foundation since 1983 and served as assistant director and program coordinator for foreign relations (1987–1994) and director of the International Istanbul Jazz Festival (1994–2002) before being appointed as general director in 2002.

A Boğaziçi University history graduate, Taner is currently faculty member of the Cultural Management Program of Istanbul Bilgi University. He is a board member of the Istanbul Modern Art Museum and chairman of the European Cultural Foundation. Previously, he served as the president of the European Jazz Festival Association between 1998 and 2002. He was a member of the advisory board of the Istanbul 2010 European Capital of Culture Agency.

He was the Turkish commissioner during the Cultural Season of Turkey in France, between July 2009 and March 2010. Following this task, he was awarded by the French government with the legion of honour (Chevalier dans l’ordre national de la Légion d'honneur) in January 2011.

In September 2010, he was appointed the Art Consultant of the Amsterdam Municipality. He is a member of the international advisory committee of the Master of Management in International Arts Management in Montreal since November 2012.

References

1959 births
Living people
Boğaziçi University alumni
Academic staff of Istanbul Bilgi University